is a railway station in the city of Murayama, Yamagata, Japan, operated by East Japan Railway Company (JR East).

Lines
Murayama Station is served by the Ōu Main Line and the Yamagata Shinkansen, with direct high-speed Tsubasa services to and from Tokyo. It is located 113.5 rail kilometers from the terminus of both lines at Fukushima Station and 386.3 kilometers from Tokyo Station.

Station layout

The station has one side platform and one island platform connected to the station building by a footbridge. The station has a Midori no Madoguchi staffed ticket office.

Platforms

History
A new station building was completed in March 1935. The station was absorbed into the JR East network upon the privatization of JNR on 1 April 1987. The station was renamed Murayama Station on 4 December 1999 with the start of Yamagata Shinkansen operations. The current station building was completed on the same date.

Passenger statistics
In fiscal 2018, the station was used by an average of 1008 passengers daily (boarding passengers only).

Surrounding area
 Murayama City Hall
 Murayama Post Office

See also
 List of railway stations in Japan

References

External links

 JR East station information 

Railway stations in Yamagata Prefecture
Stations of East Japan Railway Company
Yamagata Shinkansen
Ōu Main Line
Railway stations in Japan opened in 1901
Murayama, Yamagata